Ivan Pavlov (born 18 August 1983) is a Bulgarian football player currently playing for Slivnishki geroi as a midfielder.

Awards
 Champion of Bulgaria: 2003 (with CSKA Sofia)

External links
 

1983 births
Living people
Bulgarian footballers
First Professional Football League (Bulgaria) players
FC Lokomotiv 1929 Sofia players
PFC CSKA Sofia players
PFC Lokomotiv Mezdra players
PFC Spartak Varna players
FC Sportist Svoge players

Association football midfielders